Göteborgs Fotbollförbund (Gothenburg Football Association) is one of the 24 district organisations of the Swedish Football Association. It administers lower tier football in Gothenburg and surrounding municipalities.

Background 

Göteborgs Fotbollförbund, commonly referred to as Göteborgs FF, is the governing body for football in the Gothenburg area. The Association currently has 235 member clubs.  Based in Gothenburg, the Association's Chairman is Bert Andersson.

Affiliated Members 

The following clubs are affiliated to the Göteborgs FF:

Ahlafors BK
Ahlafors Idrottsförening
AIF Göteborg
Al-Furat Irakisk IF
Al-Noor Förening
Askims IK
Assyriska BK
Atlas FC
Avenyn United Futsal Club
Azalea BK
Babylon SK
Backatorp IF
Balltorps FF
Bergsjö IF
Bergums IF
Billdals BK
Björndammens BK
Bjurslätts IF
BK Apslätten
BK Bifrost
BK Björkåsen
BK Häcken
BK Häcken DF
BK Krabba
BK Lobo
BK Östergärde
BK S:t Jakob
BK Skjutet
BK Skottfint
BK Tynnered
BK Wobbler
Blå Staden/Tingstads IF
Bohus IF
Bokedalens IF
Bratstvo FF
Croatia Göteborg
Cruz Azul IF
Dalen/Krokslätts FF
Damavand IF
Diseröd SK
Donsö IS
Elisedals IS
Eriksbergs IF
Evins KIF
Fadini FF
Färjenäs IF
Fässbergs IF
FC Ale
FC Bosona
FC Fiskebäck
FC Göteborg United
FC Gothia
FC Heden
FC Komarken
FC Majorna
FC Roma United
FC Show
FC Sparta
Finlandia/Pallo Arvesgärde IF
FK Kozara
FK Lokomotiv Göteborg
Floda BoIF
Floda BoIF FC
Football Club Gole
Förenad Turkisk Ungdom
Fotö GoIF
Fräntorp Qviding IF
Futsal Club Charrua
Futsal Club Ibra
Futsal Club Linné
Futsal Club Tranquillo
GAIS
Gameoff IF
Gårda BK
Gårdstens IF
Gårdstens MIK
Götaholms BK
Göteborg Sportsacademy IF
Göteborgs AIK
Göteborgs Bosna IF
Göteborgs City FF
Göteborgs FF
Göteborgs Futsal Club
Göteborgs SIF
Gothenburg Celtic FC
Gothia Futsal Förening
Grimmereds BK
Grunden BOIS
Guldhedens IK
Guldringens SK
Gunnilse IS
Hällesåker DIF
Hällesåker IF
Hallstenshagens FF
Hälsö BK
Hålta IK
Härryda IF
Hermansby IF
Hisingsbacka DFK
Hisingsbacka FC
Hjuviks AIK
Högaborg Kärralunds FC
Hönö IS
Hovås Billdal IF
Hyppelns IK
IF Angered United
IF Hakoah
IF Jedinstvo
IF Mölndal Fotboll
IF Stendy
IF Vardar/Makedonija
IF Väster
IF Warta
IFK Björkö
IFK Göteborg
IFK Hällingsjö
IFK Hindås
IFK Mölndal
IK Kongahälla
IK Surd
IK Virgo
IK Zenith
Irakiska IK
Järnbrotts IF
Jitex BK
Jitex DFF
Jitex FC
Jonsereds IF
Kållered SK
Kalvsunds IF
Kap Verde IF
Kareby IS
Käringöns FC
Kärra KIF
Kaverös BK
KF Velebit
Knippla IK
Kode IF
Kopparbergs/Göteborg FC
Kortedala IF
Kungälvs FF
Kungsladugårds BK
Kurdistan IK
Landala IF
Landvetter IF
Landvetter IS
Lärje-Angereds IF
Låtta Marta IF
Lekstorps IF
Lerums Futsal Club
Lerums IS
Lindholmens/Länsmansgårdens BK
Lindome GIF
Lövet/Johannebergs IF
Lundby IF 06
Lunden Överås BK
Majorna BK
Majornas IK
Marieholm BoIK
Masthuggets BK
Menisken IF
Midnimo IF
Mölnlycke BK
Mölnlycke IF
Mölnlycke IS
Mossens BK
Mossens FC
Näsets IK
Näsets SK
Neutrala IF
Nödinge SK
Nol IK
Palestinska IF
Partille IF
Persepolis FF
Proletären FF
Pushers BK
Qviding FIF
Rambergets SK
Rannebergens IF
Rävlanda AIS
Real Maskin BK
Rödbo IF
Romelanda UF
Rörö IF
S:t Malke IF
Sandarna BK
Sannegårdens IF
Säve SK
Sävedalens IF
Serbiska KIF Semberija Göteborg
SF Sindjelic
Sjövalla FK
Sjöviks SK
SK Argo
SK Höjden Göteborg
Skogens IF
Skogshyddans IS-Helböhmen FCK
Slottsskogen/Godhem IF
Smirket United FC
Södra Skärgården IK
Solängens BK
Solväders FC
Somalia SK
Somalisk Banadir IF
Somalisk Vikingar IS
Stenkullens GOIK
Styrsö BK
Surte IS FK
Svensk-Somaliska VF
Syrianska IF Angered
Syrianska/Arameiska Föreningen Göteborg
Team Utbynäs DFF
Tollereds IF
Torslanda FC
Torslanda IK
Tuve IF
United Africa FC
Utbynäs SK
Utsiktens BK
Västkustens BK
Västra Frölunda IF
Vrångö IF
Ytterby FC
Ytterby IS
Älvängens IK
Älvsborg FF
Öckerö BK
Öckerö IF
Öjersjö BK
Öjersjö IF
Olskrokens IF
Önnereds IK
Örgryte Fotboll AB
Örgryte IS
Ösets BK

League Competitions 
Göteborgs FF run the following League Competitions:

Men's Football
Division 4  -  two sections
Division 5  -  two sections
Division 6  -  four sections
Division 7  -  four sections

Women's Football
Division 3  -  one section
Division 4  -  two sections
Division 5 -  one section

Footnotes

External links 
 Göteborgs FF Official Website 

Goteborg
Football in Gothenburg
Organizations based in Gothenburg